Boca de la Zanja may refer to:
Boca de la Zanja, another name for Boca Toma, a small dam in Argentina
Boca de la Zanja, a lake in Puerto Rico